Woodlawn Sanitarium (referred to as Woodlawn Sanitarium, Inc. by the NYC Municipal Civil Service Commission) was an early 20th century hospital located in the Woodlawn section of The Bronx.

In 1936, the hospital's president, Dr. Arthur F. Cody had apparently committed suicide.

By 1940 they were advertising having "modern equipment, including X-Ray, Fluoroscope."

References

Defunct hospitals in the Bronx
History of the Bronx